Camillo Borghese (died 8 October 1612) was a Roman Catholic prelate who served as Archbishop of Siena (1607–1612),
Bishop of Montalcino (1600–1607), and Bishop of Castro di Puglia (1594–1600).

Biography
On 5 September 1594, Camillo Borghese was appointed during the papacy of Pope Clement VIII as Bishop of Castro di Puglia.
On 8 September 1594, he was consecrated bishop by Ottaviano Paravicini, Bishop of Alessandria della Paglia, with Claude Sozomene, Bishop of Pula, and Giovanni Antonio Viperani, Bishop of Giovinazzo, serving as co-consecrators. 
On 7 January 1600, he was transferred by Pope Clement VIII to the diocese of Montalcino.
On 24 January 1607, he was appointed Archbishop of Siena by his cousin, Pope Paul V (Borghese).
He served as Archbishop of Siena until his death on 8 October 1612.

References

Sources

External links
 (Chronology of Bishops) 
 (for Chronology of Bishops) 

16th-century Italian Roman Catholic bishops
17th-century Italian Roman Catholic archbishops
Bishops appointed by Pope Clement VIII
Bishops appointed by Pope Paul V
1612 deaths